Battle of Uclés may refer to: 

Battle of Uclés (1108), a battle in the Crusades between Castile and León alliance against the Almoravids
Battle of Uclés (1809), a battle in the Peninsular War between France and Spain